Falkiner is a surname. Notable people with the surname include:

Daniel Falkiner (1683–1759), Irish politician
Norman Falkiner (1872–1929), Australian politician
Otway Falkiner (1909–2000), Australian politician
Riggs Falkiner ( 1712–1797), Irish baronet and politician
Sophie Falkiner (born 1973), Australian television presenter
Falkiner baronets